Python Imaging Library is a free and open-source additional library for the Python programming language that adds support for opening, manipulating, and saving many different image file formats. It is available for Windows,  and Linux. The latest version of PIL is 1.1.7, was released in September 2009 and supports Python 1.5.2–2.7.

Development of the original project, known as PIL, was discontinued in 2011. Subsequently, a successor project named Pillow forked the PIL repository and added Python 3.x support. This fork has been adopted as a replacement for the original PIL in Linux distributions including Debian and Ubuntu (since 13.04).

Capabilities
PIL offers several standard procedures for image manipulation. These include:
 per-pixel manipulations,
 masking and transparency handling,
 image filtering, such as blurring, contouring, smoothing, or edge finding,
 image enhancing, such as sharpening, adjusting brightness, contrast or color,
 adding text to images and much more.

File formats
Some of the file formats supported are PPM, PNG, JPEG, GIF, TIFF, and BMP.
It is also possible to create new file decoders to expand the library of file formats accessible.

Example of use
This example loads an image from the file system, blurs it, and shows both the original and the blurred image on the screen:
from PIL import Image, ImageFilter  # Import classes from the library.

original_image = Image.open("file.ppm")  # Load an image from the file system.
blurred_image = original_image.filter(ImageFilter.BLUR)  # Blur the image.

# Display both images.
original_image.show()
blurred_image.show()
This example loads and rotates an image by 180 degrees:
from PIL import Image  # Import Image class from the library.

image = Image.open("file.jpg")  # Load the image.
rotated_image = image.rotate(180)  # Rotate the image by 180 degrees.
rotated_image.save("file_rotated.jpg")  # Save the rotated image.

This example loads and crops an image:from PIL import Image  # Import Image class from library.

image = Image.open("example.jpg")  # Load image.
cropped_image = image.crop((100, 100, 250, 250))  # Crop the image.
cropped_image.save("example_cropped.jpg")  # Save the image.

License
The Python Imaging Library (PIL) is
  Copyright © 1997-2011 by Secret Labs AB
  Copyright © 1995-2011 by Fredrik Lundh
Based on

References

External links

PIL Library reference

Pillow (Successor project)
PIL Tutorial Examples

Graphics libraries
Python (programming language) libraries